Butcher Creek may refer to:

Butcher Creek (Missouri), a stream in Missouri
Butcher Creek (Perkins County, South Dakota)
Butcher Creek (Meade and Ziebach counties, South Dakota)
Butchers Creek, Queensland, a locality in Australia